Jafarabad (also Romanized as Ja‘farābād; is a city in Qeshlaq Dasht District of Bileh Savar County, Ardabil province, Iran. At the 2006 census, its population was 24,685 in 5,262 households. The following census in 2011 counted 7,706 people in 2,024 households. The latest census in 2016 showed a population of 7,226 people in 2,037 households.

Jafarabad is the center of Qeshlaq-e Sharqi Rural District and of Qeshlaq Dasht District, located about 26 km northwest of Bileh Savar, the capital of the county, in the Mughan Plain.

The expansion of the urban area of ​​Jafarabad is also in the northwest-southeast direction, and longitudinally, and the main road of Bileh Savar Moghan—Parsabad Moghan passes through it. The place of Jafarabad and its surrounding plains was considered as Qeshlaq of Shahsawan nomads in the past. Due to the favorable geographical location, the first construction activities of the region started there. With the start of the construction activities of the Shiar Azarbaijan company around 1318 AH, the initial nucleus of the settlement was formed. and with the implementation of the rural leader plan (from the rural development plans prepared by the Islamic Revolution Housing Foundation and  Reforms) is residential fabric became more regular.

Tageo

References 

Bileh Savar County

Populated places in Ardabil Province

Populated places in Bileh Savar County

Cities in Ardabil Province

Towns and villages in Bileh Savar County